Dillon Mitchell (born May 16, 1997) is an American football wide receiver for the Edmonton Elks of the Canadian Football League (CFL). He played college football at Oregon and was selected by the Minnesota Vikings in the seventh round, 239th overall of the 2019 NFL Draft.

Early years
Mitchell attended White Station High School in Memphis, Tennessee. As a junior in 2015, he was named first-team All-State selection and district Offensive Player of the Year and also earned the 2015 Tennessee Titans Mr. Football Class 6A Back of the Year award. In his senior season, he was named Tennessee’s Gatorade football player of the year after he caught 81 passes for 1,484 yards and 22 touchdowns, leading the Spartans to a 9-4 record and the Class 6A quarterfinals. He also rushed for 951 yards and 20 more touchdowns on 64 carries. Mitchell also played basketball as a point guard and ran track for the Spartans.

Highly touted as both a basketball and football player, Mitchell committed to the University of Oregon to play college football, picking the Ducks over a list that also included Ole Miss, Mississippi State, Alabama, Auburn, Tennessee and Cincinnati.

College career
As a true freshman at Oregon in 2016, Mitchell played in six games and had two receptions for nine yards. As a sophomore in 2017, he started 12 games and had 42 receptions for 517 yards and four touchdowns. As a junior in 2018, Mitchell set the school record for receiving yards in a season with 1,184 on 75 receptions and 10 touchdowns. He was named the MVP of the 2018 Redbox Bowl. After the season, Mitchell entered the 2019 NFL Draft.

Professional career

Minnesota Vikings 
Mitchell was drafted in the seventh round (239th overall pick) of the 2019 NFL Draft by the Minnesota Vikings. He was the third Oregon player chosen in the draft and became just the second Ducks receiver drafted in the last 10 years, joining Josh Huff. He was waived on August 31, 2019 and was signed to the practice squad the next day. He signed a reserve/future contract with the Vikings on January 13, 2020, and was waived by the Vikings during final roster cuts on September 5, 2020.

Edmonton Elks 
On July 29, 2022, Mitchell signed with the Edmonton Elks of the Canadian Football League (CFL). Mitchell had a strong rookie season in the CFL, finishing with 35 receptions for 637 yards and four touchdowns. On October 25, 2022, the Elks announced agree to a two-year contract extension with Mitchell through the 2025 season.

References

External links
Oregon Ducks bio

1997 births
Living people
Players of American football from Memphis, Tennessee
American football wide receivers
Oregon Ducks football players
Minnesota Vikings players